The 2008 Georgia Republican presidential primary took place on February 5, 2008 (Super Tuesday), with 72 national delegates at stake. Mike Huckabee was the winner of the primary.

Results 

* Candidate dropped out of the race before the primary

See also 

 Republican Party (United States) presidential primaries, 2008
 Georgia Democratic primary, 2008

References 

Georgia
2008 Georgia (U.S. state) elections
2008 Super Tuesday
Georgia Republican primaries